Adam Parker Block (February 7, 1951 – January 27, 2008) was a San Francisco-based writer and music critic for The Advocate, for which he wrote a regular column entitled Block on Rock. He interviewed numerous pop stars as well as lesser known music artists, helping to raise awareness of the emerging queercore movement.

He died of pulmonary illness due to AIDS on January 27, 2008, aged 56, in San Francisco, California.

References

External links
Adam Block Memorial
Confessions of a Gay Rocker by Adam Block
Summer and Smoke by Adam Block
Advocate pieces '84-'92

1951 births
2008 deaths
AIDS-related deaths in California
American music critics
American gay writers
20th-century American LGBT people
21st-century LGBT people